Aluminium sulfide is a chemical compound with the formula Al2S3. This colorless species has an interesting structural chemistry, existing in several forms. The material is sensitive to moisture, hydrolyzing to hydrated aluminum oxides/hydroxides. This can begin when the sulfide is exposed to the atmosphere. The hydrolysis reaction generates gaseous hydrogen sulfide (H2S).

Crystal structure
More than six crystalline forms of aluminum sulfide are known and only some are listed below. Most of them have rather similar, wurtzite-like structures, and differ by the arrangement of lattice vacancies, which form ordered or disordered sublattices.

The β and γ phases are obtained by annealing the most stable α-Al2S3 phase at several hundred degrees Celsius. Compressing aluminum sulfide to 2–65 bar results in the δ phase where vacancies are arranged in a superlattice of tetragonal symmetry.

Unlike Al2O3, in which the Al(III) centers occupy octahedral holes, the more expanded framework of Al2S3 stabilizes the Al(III) centers into one third of the tetrahedral holes of a hexagonally close-packed arrangement of the sulfide anions. At higher temperature, the Al(III) centers become randomized to give a "defect wurtzite" structure. And at still higher temperatures stabilize the γ-Al2S3 forms, with a structure akin to γ-Al2O3.

Molecular derivatives of Al2S3 are not known. Mixed Al-S-Cl compounds are however known. Al2Se3 and Al2Te3 are also known.

Preparation
Aluminum sulfide is readily prepared by ignition of the elements

2 Al + 3 S → Al2S3

This reaction is extremely exothermic and it is not necessary or desirable to heat the whole mass of the sulfur-aluminum mixture; (except possibly for very small amounts of reactants). The product will be created in a fused form; it reaches a temperature greater than 1100 °C and may melt its way through steel. The cooled product is very hard.

References

Sulfides
Aluminium compounds